Kallimedu is a village under the Talaignairu panchayat located near Vedaranyam in the Nagapattinam district, Tamil Nadu. The village is reachable from Vedaraniyam in 30 minutes and 60 minutes from Nagapattinam. There are approach roads available for umblachery.

There is another village named Kallimedu near Coimbatore.

Education
Kallimedu has a Government High School and is a member in Vigyan Prasar.

Temples
The Kaaliamman, Perumal and Throwpathai Amman temples are famous in this village.

With Sri Throwpathai Amman Temple a main deity, there are also temples of Sri Aravan, Sri Muthal Rawuther, Sri Periachi, Sri Kaliamman, Sri Mariamman, Sri KamalaKanni, Sri Vinayagar and Sri Murugan. The "Fire walking" festival is one of the most important festival here.

Villages in Nagapattinam district